Ángel Adami Airport  is a controlled general aviation airport serving Montevideo, Uruguay, located in the northwestern outskirts of the metropolitan area. The airport and its surrounding area are commonly known as "Aviación" or, due to its location in the neighborhood of Lezica-Melilla, as "Aeródromo de Melilla".

The Adami non-directional beacon (Ident: ASI) is located on the field.

See also

 Transport in Uruguay
 List of airports in Uruguay

References

External links
OpenStreetMap - Ángel Adami Airport.

Airports in Uruguay
Buildings and structures in Montevideo
Transport in Montevideo